Pseudopleuronectes obscurus, or dark flounder is a flatfish of the family Pleuronectidae. It is a demersal fish that lives on salt bottoms in the temperate waters of the northwestern Pacific, from Hokkaido to the Kuril Islands, the Sea of Okhotsk, Sakhalin and the Tatar Strait to the northeastern coast of Korea and the Yellow Sea.

References

Pleuronectidae
Taxa named by Solomon Herzenstein
Fish of the Pacific Ocean
Fish described in 1890